Vratislav Čech (born January 28, 1979) is a Czech former professional ice hockey defenceman.  He played in the Czech Extraliga for HC Femax Havířov, HC Kladno and HC Plzeň.  He was drafted 56th overall by the Florida Panthers in the 1997 NHL Entry Draft.

Career statistics

References

External links

1979 births
Living people
Ice hockey people from Brno
Atlantic City Boardwalk Bullies players
Czech ice hockey defencemen
Florida Panthers draft picks
Greenville Grrrowl players
HC Havířov players
Rytíři Kladno players
HC Kometa Brno players
HC Plzeň players
Kitchener Rangers players
Providence Bruins players
Czech expatriate ice hockey players in Canada
Czech expatriate ice hockey players in the United States